Robert Andrew Doyle (12 February 1916 – 22 January 2009) was a communist activist and soldier from Ireland. He was active in two armed conflicts; the Spanish Civil War as a member of the International Brigades and the Second World War as a member of the British Empire's Merchant Navy.

Early life
Doyle was born in a North King Street tenement in Dublin, Ireland and became interested in politics during the 1930s. In 1933, he was part of an anti - communist mob that attacked Connolly House. He joined the Irish Republican Army (IRA) after losing his left eye in a brawl with Blueshirts. He quickly became more interested in social rather than Irish nationalist issues and in 1937 decided to volunteer for the International Brigades, motivated in part by the fact that his friend and IRA veteran Kit Conway had been killed in action in the Battle of Jarama on Doyle’s 21st birthday.

Service in Spain
He initially attempted to travel to Spain by stowing away aboard a boat bound for Valencia, where he was detained and expelled. He eventually returned by crossing the Pyrenees from France. After he returned to Spain, he reported to a battalion at Figueras. He was initially required to train new recruits because of his IRA experience, but disobeyed orders to get to the front.

Capture and release
After fighting at Belchite, he was captured at Gandesa by the Italian fascist Corpo Truppe Volontarie in 1938, along with Irish International Brigade leader Frank Ryan.

He was imprisoned for 11 months in  San Pedro de Cardeña - a concentration camp near Burgos. There he was once brought out to be shot and he was regularly tortured by Spanish fascist guards and interrogated by the Gestapo before being released in a prisoner exchange.

World War II service

Doyle enlisted in the British merchant navy during World War II before settling in London with his Spanish wife, Lola. He became active in the Fleet Street print trade unions.

A regular visitor to Spain and Ireland for International Brigade commemorations, he published an account of his experiences in Spain in Brigadista: An Irishman’s Fight Against Fascism.

In an interview with The Irish Times, he said: "I thought there was a danger that Ireland would go fascist and that was one of the motivating factors in making up my mind to go to Spain."

Family
Doyle and his wife Lola later gave birth to a son, noted film editor and special effects wizard Julian Doyle (filmmaker), who worked on such films as "Monty Python and the Holy Grail" and "Time Bandits".

Death
Bob Doyle died at the age of 92 on 22 January 2009. His ashes were carried at the head of a funeral procession through the streets of Dublin. Large numbers of people, including members of the Irish Labour Party, the Communist Party of Ireland and Sinn Féin, were in attendance.

In early July 2019, a plaque was unveiled by his granddaughter on North King Street where he was born.

References

External links
 Bob Doyle, Spanish Civil War veteran, dies aged 92 Irish Times
 
 Imperial War Museum Interview

1916 births
2009 deaths
British Merchant Navy personnel of World War II
International Brigades personnel
Irish Republican Army (1922–1969) members
Irish anti-fascists
Irish people of the Spanish Civil War
Military personnel from Dublin (city)
Spanish Civil War prisoners of war